Teenagers from Outer Space (a.k.a. The Gargon Terror (UK title), The Boy from Outer Space, and originally titled The Ray Gun Terror) is a 1959 American independent black-and-white science fiction cult film released by Warner Bros. The film was produced, written, and directed by Tom Graeff and stars David Love, Dawn Bender, Bryan Grant, Harvey B. Dunn, Tom Graeff, and King Moody. Teenagers from Outer Space was distributed theatrically by Warner Bros. on a double feature with Gigantis the Fire Monster, the English-dubbed version of the 1955 Japanese giant monster film Godzilla Raids Again.

In the film, a young alien named Derek abandons his crew to search for a new life on Earth, while one of his crewmates is sent to find him as they attempt to eradicate human life in order to farm Earth with giant lobster-like livestock they call Gargons.

In 1987, the film entered the public domain in the United States because Warner Bros. did not renew its copyright registration in the 28th year after publication.

Plot
A flying saucer arrives on Earth while searching for planets suitable to raise "Gargons", a lobster-like but air-breathing monster that is a reserve food supply on their home planet. Crewman Thor shows his alien contempt for Earth's creatures, by needlessly vaporizing a dog named Sparky with a disintegrator raygun. Another crew member by the name of Derek, discovers an inscription on Sparky's dog tag and fears the Gargons might destroy Earth's native inhabitants. This makes the other aliens scoff at the thought. Being members of the "supreme race", they disdain "foreign beings", no matter how intelligent; they pride themselves that "families" and "friendships" are forbidden on their world. Derek reveals an ancient book and turns out to be a member of an underground rebellion, that commemorates the more humane periods of their world's history, before they became mechanized slaves.

Asking for the book, the Captain and Thor disarms Derek. Taking him as prisoner, they plan to put Derek on trial and have him executed by the high court. The Gargon they brought with them suddenly falls sick to Earth's atmosphere. While his crew members are distracted, Derek escapes on foot. Eventually, the Gargon regains consciousness. When the Captain gives his report, it is revealed that Derek is the son of the Leader of their race, although he is unaware of this. Thor is sent to hunt down Derek, with orders to bring him back alive or kill him and any other intelligent beings to protect their mission to Earth. The rest of the crew return to their home world, leaving the Gargon behind in a nearby cave.

Meanwhile, Derek arrives at the address he found on the dog's tag, where he meets Betty Morgan and her Grandpa. They have a room to rent, and Derek inadvertently becomes a boarder. When Betty's friend, reporter Joe Rogers, cannot make it to their afternoon swim at Alice Woodward's place, Derek tags along with Betty. He shows the tag to Betty, who recognizes it immediately. Derek takes her to the place where the spacecraft landed and shows her Sparky's remains. She does not believe him, so he describes Thor's weapon that can also vaporize humans. Betty takes this surprisingly well and vows to help Derek stop his crew mate.

For the rest of the day Betty and Derek have several run-ins with Thor, who vaporizes several humans, including Alice and Professor Simpson from earlier, and Joe follows up on stories of skeletons popping up all over town. Eventually Thor is wounded in a shoot out with the police. And he then kidnaps both Derek and Betty to help him receive medical attention, in the process revealing Derek's true parentage to them. Two car chases and a gunfight follow, and Thor is finally captured by Earth authorities after plummeting off a cliff in a stolen car.

Shortly after, the Gargon grows immensely large, after devouring a policeman investigating the alien's landing site and attacking numerous people. Derek and Betty go to the car wreck site to look for Thor's raygun. They kiss, and Derek vows to stay on Earth. The Gargon suddenly appears and ruins their romantic moment, but Derek finds the raygun under a rock just in time for them to escape. Unfortunately, it is damaged and out of power. The giant Gargon begins heading towards the town. They follow and confront it, having used the electricity from the overhead power lines to fuel the raygun's components. Derek eventually kills the monster, but it's too late. The invading fleet appears in Earth's orbit.

Derek retrieves Thor from the police and everyone, including Joe and Grandpa, hurry to the landing site. He then reunites with the Captain and meets his father for the first time. Derek pretends to feel regret for his insubordination and offers to help guide the spaceships to land. Derek then goes into the spacecraft alone and makes the ultimate sacrifice. Leading the invasion fleet at full speed directly towards his ground location and causing a massive explosion. Killing his father, the Captain and Thor in the process. Derek does not survive the blast but is remembered by Betty for declaring, "I shall make the Earth my home. And I shall never, never leave it."

Cast

 David Love as Derek
 Dawn Bender as Betty Morgan
 Bryan Grant as Thor
 Harvey B. Dunn as Gramps Morgan
 Tom Graeff (billed as Tom Lockyear) as Joe Rogers
 King Moody as Spacecraft Captain
 Ralph Lowe as Morro, Spaceship Crew
 Bill DeLand as Sol, Spaceship Crew
 Billy Bridges as Motorist picking up Thor
 Sonia Torgeson as Alice Woodward
 Jim MacGeorge as Detective Mac
 Frederick Welch as Dr. C.R. Brandt, MD
 Helen Sage as Nurse Morse
 Gene Sterling as The Alien Leader
 Sol Resnick as the Junior Astronomer
 Don Chambers as the Senior Astronomer
 Carl Dickensen as Gas Station Attendant
 Ursula Hansen as Hilda, Simpson's Secretary
 James Conklin as Professor Simpson

Production
Teenagers from Outer Space was filmed on location in and around Hollywood, California, in the fall of 1956 and winter of 1957. With a number of tell-tale landmarks like Bronson Canyon in Griffith Park and Hollywood High School, which gives away the film's otherwise generic location. One notable aspect of the film is that it was largely the work of a single person, Tom Graeff, who, in addition to playing the role of reporter Joe Rogers, wrote, directed, edited, and produced the film, on which he also provided cinematography, special effects, and music coordination. Producers Bryan and Ursula Pearson ("Thor" and "Hilda") and Gene Sterling ("The Leader") provided the film's $14,000 budget, which was less than shoestring even by the standards of the day.

Cost-effective measures
According to Bryan Pearson, the crew employed many guerrilla tactics in order to cut costs. Director Tom Graeff secured for free the location used for Betty Morgan's house by posing as a UCLA student (which he had attended and graduated from 5 years earlier). The older woman who owned the house even let the crew use her electricity to power their equipment.

Graeff shot in many nearby locations, mostly in the vicinity of Sunset Boulevard and Highland Avenue, that doubled as more important city landmarks. Graeff's steady hand and framing kept most of the real locations subdued, creating a convincing low-budget illusion of a small town.

Other cost-cutting measures did not work as well: The aliens' costumes were simple flight suits clearly decorated with masking tape, dress shoes covered in socks, and surplus Air Force flight helmets. The use of stock footage, in lieu of real special effects and pre-Spielbergian "looking" shots that replaced actual visuals of the invading alien spaceships, seriously undercut the film's ending. Props included a single-bolted-joint skeleton re-used for every dead body seen on screen, a multi-channel sound mixer that was not camouflaged (clearly bearing the label "Multichannel Mixer MCM-2") as a piece of alien equipment, and a dime store Hubley's "Atomic Disintegrator" toy as the aliens' disintegrator ray gun. 

Graeff hired special effects technician Paul Blaisdell to slightly modify the ray guns with small slivers of mirror to make the guns look as if they were really firing a ray. Blaisdell said Graeff also paid him to design the film's one-sheet poster, but Graeff couldn't afford Blaisdell's fee to design the Gargon monsters that appear in the film (Graeff did those effects himself by superimposing silhouetted images of various animals in Bert I. Gordon fashion).

Sound design and score
Graeff also pre-recorded some of the film's dialogue for several scenes and had the actors lip-synchronize their dialogue with their scene actions, using a novel synchronization system invented by director Tom Graeff, dubbed Cinemagraph. The film score used stock music, which had been composed by William Loose and Fred Steiner. The same stock music has been recycled in countless B-movies, like Red Zone Cuba, The Killer Shrews, and most notably Night of the Living Dead.

Release and legacy
In June 1958 Bryan Pearson, who invested $5,000 in the production with his wife Ursula, took Graeff to court in order to gain back the original investment and a percentage of any profits. The Pearsons had learned that Graeff had allegedly sold the film (originally titled The Boy From Out of This World), which did not happen until early 1959. He heard nothing more on their investment or a percentage of profits to which they were entitled. The legal dispute dragged on for a year. Pearson received his $5,000 investment, but the judge ruled there was no profit to share. Tom and the Pearsons, who had been good friends during the production of Teenagers, never spoke to each other again.

The film failed to perform at the box office, placing further stress on an already-burdened Graeff, and in the fall of 1959, he suffered a breakdown, proclaiming himself as the second coming of Christ.
After a number of public appearances, followed by a subsequent arrest for disrupting a church service, Graeff disappeared from Hollywood until 1964. He committed suicide in 1970.

The film went on to become a cult classic among sci-fi fans and was later shown on Mystery Science Theater 3000, Elvira's Movie Macabre, and Off Beat Cinema. It was also included in the video game Destroy All Humans! It becomes unlocked and ready to play in full once the player beats the game.

Critical reception
The film opened on June 3, 1959 to negative but not crippling reviews. The Los Angeles Times review stated "what a curious little film this is [...] there are flashes of astonishing sensitivity half buried in the mass of tritisms." And of the director, Tom Graeff, "when he stops spreading himself so incredibly thin, I think his work will bear watching".
Writing in DVD Savant, although film critic Glenn Erickson described the film as "staged at the level of a high-school play," with the giant Gargon "a crudely matted silhouette that may be the least convincing [special] effect of the 1950s," the film nevertheless is "actually quite touching - the show finds its own humble level of dramatic integrity."

Public domain
In 1987, the film entered the public domain in the United States and worldwide because Warner Bros. did not renew the film's copyright registration in the 28th year after its creation. As a result, the film has received numerous "bargain bin" DVD releases. MST3Ks version was released by Rhino Home Video as part of their "Collection, Volume 6" box set.

See also
 List of American films of 1959
 List of films in the public domain in the United States

References

Bibliography
 Warren, Bill. Keep Watching the Skies! American Science Fiction Movies of the Fifties (covers films released through 1962), 21st Century Edition. Jefferson, North Carolina: McFarland & Company, 2009 (First Edition 1982). .

External links

 
 
 
 
Elvira's take on ShoutFactoryTV
 
Joe Dante on Teenagers from Outer Space at Trailers from Hell
The out-loud life and silent death of Teenagers From Outer Space creator Tom Graeff

1950s teen films
1959 films
1959 horror films
1950s science fiction horror films
1950s monster movies
American science fiction horror films
American black-and-white films
1950s English-language films
Films about extraterrestrial life
American monster movies
American independent films
Articles containing video clips
American exploitation films
1959 directorial debut films
1959 independent films
Films shot in Los Angeles
Teensploitation
1950s American films